The Washington Armory is a former Pennsylvania National Guard armory in Washington, Pennsylvania.  It was designed by W. G. Wilkins Company.  It was listed on the National Register of Historic Places on May 9, 1991.

It is designated as a historic public landmark by the Washington County History & Landmarks Foundation.

History 
The armory was sold by the Pennsylvania Department of Military and Veterans Affairs to a private individual in 1997. It was converted into Julian's Banquet Hall.

See also 
 National Register of Historic Places listings in Washington County, Pennsylvania

References

External links 

 [ Washington Armory], National Register of Historic Places nomination form

Armories on the National Register of Historic Places in Pennsylvania
Pennsylvania National Guard
Colonial Revival architecture in Pennsylvania
Buildings and structures in Washington County, Pennsylvania
Infrastructure completed in 1915
Washington, Pennsylvania
National Register of Historic Places in Washington County, Pennsylvania
1915 establishments in Pennsylvania